Massimo Minetti (born 11 April 1978) is an Italian footballer. Minetti played over 100 games at Serie C1.

External links

Italian footballers
A.C. Reggiana 1919 players
S.S. Fidelis Andria 1928 players
Treviso F.B.C. 1993 players
Pisa S.C. players
Genoa C.F.C. players
A.C.R. Messina players
Hellas Verona F.C. players
Como 1907 players
Serie A players
Association football forwards
Footballers from Genoa
1976 births
Living people
S.S.D. Sanremese Calcio players
S.E.F. Torres 1903 players